5500 series may refer to:

 Avaya ERS 5500 Series, a series of stackable Layer 3 switches used in computer networking
 Hanshin 5500 series, a Japanese train type
 Toei 5500 series, a Japanese train type